Solomon Safo-Taylor (born 19 June 1998) is a Ghanaian footballer who plays as a forward for Asante Kotoko. He previously played in Denmark for Vendsyssel FF.

Club career

Karela United 
Safo-Taylor played for Karela United from 2018 to 2019, featuring for them in 2019 GFA Normalization Committee Special Competition and helping them to place second in their group and as runners-up of the Tier I after losing against Kumasi Asante Kotoko. He featured in 16 matches and scored 5 goals. He also made 3 appearances and scored 3 goals in the GHALCA Top 8 cup, making it 8 goals in 19 appearances. In that process he formed a deadly attacking duo with Diawisie Taylor.

Vendsyssel FF 
In August 2019, Safo-Taylor signed a 4-year deal for Hjørring-based Danish 1st Division side Vendsyssel FF for an undisclosed fee. His contract with the club was terminated by mutual consent after scoring only one goal in his six appearances. His only goal came in a Danish cup match against Kjellerup IF which ended in 9–0 win.

Asante Kotoko 
On 15 March 2021, Asante Kotoko announced that they had signed Safo-Taylor on a three and a half year deal on a free transfer. He was expected to serve as the replacement for forward Kwame Opoku, who left Kotoko for USM Alger the past week. On 13 May 2021, he made his competitive debut after coming on in the 64th minute for Francis Andy Kumi in a 2–1 victory over Ebusua Dwarfs. On 11 July 2021, he scored his debut goal, an equalizer in Kotoko's eventual 2–1 loss to Bechem United, which indirectly secured Hearts of Oak the league title.

International career 
Safo-Taylor earned a call-up to the Ghana national under-23 football team under Coach Ibrahim Tanko for the 2019 Africa U-23 Cup of Nations qualifiers in 2019.

References

External links 

 
 
 

Living people
1998 births
Association football forwards
Ghanaian footballers
Ghana Premier League players
Asante Kotoko S.C. players
Vendsyssel FF players
Karela United FC players
Danish 1st Division players
Ghanaian expatriate footballers
Expatriate men's footballers in Denmark
Footballers from Kumasi